This is a list of seasons completed by the South Carolina Gamecocks football team of the National Collegiate Athletic Association (NCAA) Division I Football Bowl Subdivision (FBS). Since the team's creation in 1892, the Gamecocks have participated in 1,078 officially sanctioned games, including 17 bowl games.

The Gamecocks have been a member of several athletic conferences. From 1892 to 1932, South Carolina competed as a football independent. From 1933 through 1952, the Gamecocks were part of the Southern Conference. In 1953, South Carolina became one of the original members of the Atlantic Coast Conference, where it remained through 1970. The Gamecocks competed as an independent again from 1971 to 1991. In 1992, South Carolina joined the Southeastern Conference's East Division, where it won a division title in 2010.

Seasons

Footnotes

References

South Carolina

South Carolina Gamecocks football seasons